The Serranía del Baudó is a coastal mountain range on the Pacific coast of Colombia. It is separated from the West Andes by the Atrato valley where the Atrato River flows and Quibdó is located. From the south the range extends from the Baudó River north and slightly west along the coast into Panama terminating at the Golfo de San Miguel. The range is called Serranía del Sapo when it is in Panama. Technically the landform extends south of the Baudó River down to Malaga Bay, but the area has been eroded into low hills and marshlands.

However, near river mouths the coast has been eroded and there are wide sandy beaches, tidal flats and even mangrove swamps.

Geology 
Geologically, the Serranía del Baudó represents an extension of the Isthmus of Panama. The mountain range started forming in the Late Cretaceous and Paleocene from oceanic volcanics that were compacted as the Nazca Plate and later Malpelo Plate pushed westward into and under the South American Plate.

Wildlife
Alto de Buey poison frog, Andinobates altobueyensis, is only known from the Alto del Buey mountain.

References 

Mountain ranges of Colombia
Geography of Chocó Department